Ismail Abdelfetah Belkacemi (born 24 June 1993) is an Algerian footballer who plays for USM Alger in the Algerian Ligue Professionnelle 1.

Club career
In 2015, Belkacemi signed a two-year contract with MO Béjaïa.

In 2018, He signed a two-year contract with CS Constantine.

On September 16, Belkacemi joined to USM Alger for three seasons, coming from CS Constantine. He made his debut for the team in the Super Cup final as a starter in a loss against CR Belouizdad.

Career statistics

Club

References

External links
 

1993 births
Living people
Algerian footballers
CS Constantine players
MO Béjaïa players
Association football forwards
21st-century Algerian people